Lokmnanya Tilak Terminus Puri Express is an Weekly Superfast Express Train belongs to Indian Railways that runs between the  (Mumbai) & Puri in India. The number of this train is given as 12145 and 12146 in both directions.

Till 11 May 2019 it was runs with ICF coach after 12 May 2019 its runs with LHB coach.

Service
This train covers the distance of 1878 km with an average speed of 54 km/h on both sides with total time of 35 hours.

As the average speed of the train is nearly 55 km/hr, as per Indian Railways rules, its fare includes a Superfast surcharge.

Routes
It reverses direction at twice during its run at  & Talcher.

Traction
As this route is partially electrified the WAP-4 pulls the train till , later WDP-4D pulls the train to the destination on both directions.

External links

References

Express trains in India
Transport in Mumbai
Transport in Puri
Rail transport in Maharashtra
Rail transport in Chhattisgarh
Rail transport in Odisha